Pendren (officially Pendraban) also known as Peren  is a village of the Indian  of state of Odisha. As per the Indian government population census of 2011, there are 723 people live. Pendren lies near the Chhattisgarh border on the south of Nuapada district.

Population
As per the Census India 2011, Pendraban village has population of 189 of which 85 are males and 104 are females. The population of children between age 0-6 is 38 which is 20.11% of total population. The sex-ratio is around 1224. The literacy rate is 51.85% out of which 72.94% males are literate and 34.62% females are literate.

References 

Villages in Nuapada district
Cities and towns in Nuapada district